Hegazi or Hegazy is an Egyptian Arabic surname. Notable people with the surname include:

Abdel Aziz Mohamed Hegazy (1923–2014), Egyptian politician 
Ahmed Hegazi (actor) (1935–2002), Egyptian actor
Ahmed Hegazi (footballer) (born 1991), Egyptian footballer
Ahmed Gaffer Hegazi (born 1948), Egyptian scientist
Hussein Hegazi (1891–1961), Egyptian footballer
Mahmoud Hegazy (born 1956), Egyptian general
Mohammed Hegazy (born 1982), Egyptian convert to Christianity
Morsi El Sayed Hegazy, Egyptian academic and economist
Safwat Hegazi (born 1963), Egyptian imam
Salama Hegazi (1852–1917), Egyptian musician
Sarah Hegazi (1989–2020), Egyptian queer activist

Arabic-language surnames